The Tuvaluan Passport is an international travel document that is issued to Tuvaluan citizens subject to Tuvaluan nationality law.

, Tuvaluan citizens had visa-free or visa on arrival access to 126 countries and territories, ranking the Tuvaluan passport 44th in terms of travel freedom (tied with the Nicaraguan and Ukrainian passports) according to the Henley visa restrictions index. Tuvalu signed a mutual visa waiver agreement with Schengen Area countries on 1 July 2016.

All Tuvaluan passports are issued in the name of the Tuvaluan monarch. The first page of a Tuvaluan passport reads:

See also
 Visa requirements for Tuvaluan citizens

References

Bibliography
Passports Act
Passports Regulations

Passports by country